Westwood is an unincorporated community in Kalamazoo Charter Township, Kalamazoo County in the U.S. state of Michigan. It is a census-designated place (CDP) for statistical purposes and does not have any legal status as an incorporated municipality. The population was 8,653 at the 2010 census, down from 9,122 at the 2000 census.

Geography
Westwood is in the western part of Kalamazoo Charter Township and is bordered to the south, east, and west by the city of Kalamazoo. M-43 is a state highway that runs through the southern part of the community, leading east into downtown Kalamazoo and west  to South Haven on Lake Michigan.

Demographics

As of the census of 2000, there were 9,122 people, 4,340 households, and 2,087 families residing in the CDP. The racial makeup of the CDP was 85.26% White, 10.59% Black or African American, 0.14% Native American, 1.57% Asian, 0.01% Pacific Islander, 0.71% from other races, and 1.72% from two or more races. Hispanic or Latino of any race were 1.37% of the population.

There were 4,340 households, out of which 19.1% had children under the age of 18 living with them, 37.7% were married couples living together, 7.7% had a female householder with no husband present, and 51.9% were non-families. 35.7% of all households were made up of individuals, and 13.7% had someone living alone who was 65 years of age or older.  The average household size was 2.10 and the average family size was 2.78.

In the CDP, the population was spread out, with 17.3% under the age of 18, 20.2% from 18 to 24, 26.6% from 25 to 44, 19.0% from 45 to 64, and 16.8% who were 65 years of age or older.  The median age was 33 years. For every 100 females, there were 85.7 males.  For every 100 females age 18 and over, there were 82.1 males.

The median income for a household in the CDP was $37,407, and the median income for a family was $53,491. Males had a median income of $38,214 versus $31,062 for females. The per capita income for the CDP was $22,686.  About 3.5% of families and 12.7% of the population were below the poverty line, including 7.9% of those under age 18 and 2.4% of those age 65 or over.

Education
It is zoned to Kalamazoo Public Schools.

References

Unincorporated communities in Kalamazoo County, Michigan
Census-designated places in Michigan
Kalamazoo–Portage metropolitan area
Unincorporated communities in Michigan
Census-designated places in Kalamazoo County, Michigan